The Football League play-offs for the 2014–15 season  (referred to as the Sky Bet Play-Offs for sponsorship reasons) began in May 2015 with the finals taking place at Wembley Stadium in London.

The play-offs began at the semi-final stage with all semi-finals being played over two legs, contested by the teams who finished in 3rd, 4th, 5th and 6th place in the Football League Championship and League One and the 4th, 5th, 6th and 7th-placed teams in the League Two table. The winners of the semi-finals then advanced to the finals, with the winner of the final gaining promotion for the following season.

Background
The Football League play-offs have been held every year since 1987. They take place for each division following the conclusion of the regular season and are contested by the four clubs finishing below the automatic promotion places.

Championship

Semi-finals

First leg

Second leg

Middlesbrough won 5–1 on aggregate.

Norwich City won 4–2 on aggregate.

Final

League One

Semi-finals

First leg

Second leg

Preston North End won 4–0 on aggregate.

Swindon Town won 7–6 on aggregate.

Final

League Two

Semi-finals

First leg

Second leg

Wycombe Wanderers won 5–3 on aggregate.

Southend United won 4–2 on aggregate.

Final

References

 
Play-offs
English Football League play-offs
Football League play-offs